Mehmet Esenceli (born 1940) is a Turkish wrestler. He competed in the men's freestyle 52 kg at the 1968 Summer Olympics.

References

External links
 

1940 births
Living people
Turkish male sport wrestlers
Olympic wrestlers of Turkey
Wrestlers at the 1968 Summer Olympics
Sportspeople from Kahramanmaraş
20th-century Turkish people